James Clifford is an American fashion designer specializing in wedding gowns.

Early life
Clifford was born and raised in Worcester, Massachusetts. As a child, he designed outfits for comic book characters and dreaming of creating clothes for the film and theater industries.

Career

Early career
Clifford attended the New England School of Design. With little intention of entering the bridal industry, his unclear plans after college resulted in him working at the House of Bianchi in Boston where he began his career as a designer.

Following his two years at the House of Bianchi, Clifford worked at Priscilla of Boston. During his time at Priscilla, he designed clothing for the First Family (the daughters of presidents Lyndon B. Johnson and Richard Nixon). James often cites the Johnson wedding, in which he designed and created the bridal party’s gowns in the Lincoln bedroom, as one of the finest moments of his career. After 19 years at Priscilla of Boston, James moved to New York City as head designer at Galina-Bouquet, Inc., where he was featured in the company’s advertisements.

In 1987, Clifford joined a major bridal manufacturer under his own label. His label was the only publicly held bridal house in the country. Originally James Clifford was known as Jim Hjelm, but rights to his name as a designer were taken away by JLM Couture in legal disputes. His gowns veered on the side of traditional and incorporated nets, silks, and lace.

Twenty-first century
In 2004, Clifford joined Mon Cheri to launch The James Clifford Collection. This collection remains popular as James continues to produce timeless gowns.

References

Living people
Year of birth missing (living people)
American fashion designers
Wedding dress designers